Werner Knab (1908–1945) was a German SS-Sturmbannführer (major). He served at the German legation in Norway from 1939, and then as head of Gestapo in Norway from 1940 to 1942, during the occupation of Norway by Nazi Germany. Among others, he led a crackdown on the University of Oslo following the milk strike, and also acted as prosecutor in the court-martial set up in the strike's wake. He died in Germany.

References

1908 births
1945 deaths
SS-Sturmbannführer
German expatriates in Norway
Gestapo personnel